Boteşti may refer to several places in Romania:

Botești, a commune in Neamţ County
Boteşti, a village in Câmpeni town, Alba County
Boteşti, a village in Scărişoara Commune, Alba County
Boteşti, a village in Zlatna town, Alba County
Boteşti, a village in Ungureni Commune, Bacău County
Boteşti, a village in Horodniceni Commune, Suceava County
Boteşti, a village in Bârna Commune, Timiș County

See also
Boţeşti (disambiguation)